Joe McGowan (7 January 1944, Mullaghmore, Co. Sligo, Ireland) is an Irish historian, folklorist, and author specialising in the history and heritage of Ireland. He is based in Sligo.

Bibliography 
1993 In the Shadow of Benbulben: A Portrait of Our Storied Past, Aeolus Publications
1998 Inishmurray: Gale, Stone and Fire, Aeolus Publications
2001  Echoes of a Savage Land, Mercier Press,
2003 Constance Markievicz: People's Countess, Cottage Press
2004 Sligo: Land of Destiny, Aeolus Publications
2005 Inishmurray: Island Voices, Aeolus Publications History and heritage of Inishmurray Island, Co. Sligo
2007 "A Fairy Wind",short stories, music, songs and monologues, Aeolus Publications
2009 "A Bitter Wind", Aeolus Publications, an account of Irish country life as it was lived up to and including the 20th century.
2015  "Sligo Folk Tales",Irish History Press, legends, myths and folklore of Co. Sligo

References

External links
Sligo Heritage, McGowan's website
Sligo Champion article

1944 births
Living people
20th-century Irish historians
21st-century Irish historians
People from County Sligo